The Lawrence, later Woollaston (or Wollaston) Baronetcy, of Loseby (i.e. Lowesby Hall) in the County of Leicester, was a title in the baronetage of Great Britain. It was created on 17 January 1748 for Edward Lawrence Esq., (died 1749), with remainder to his great-nephew, Isaac Woollaston (d.1750) of Lowesby Hall, Leicestershire. Lawrence was MP for Stockbridge. He died in 1749 and was succeeded according to the special remainder by his great-nephew, Isaac Woollaston (died 1750), the second baronet. He was the grandson of Josiah Woollaston (1652–1689) by his wife Elizabeth Lawrence, sister of the first baronet. The title became extinct on the death of the second baronet's son, the third baronet, who died as a child in 1756.

Lawrence, later Woollaston baronets, of Loseby (1748)
Sir Edward Lawrence, 1st Baronet (by 1674–1749)
Sir Isaac Woollaston, 2nd Baronet (died 1750)
Sir Isaac Lawrence Woollaston, 3rd Baronet (died 1756)

Sources
Burke, John. A Genealogical and Heraldic History of the Extinct and Dormant Baronetcies of England, p. 577.

References

Extinct baronetcies in the Baronetage of Great Britain
Baronetcies created with special remainders